Botopass (Born to be Passion) was a South Korean girl group formed by WKS ENE and JMG in 2020. The group debuted on August 26, 2020, with Flamingo. The group consisted of 8 members: Mihee, Jiwon, Cui Xiang, Seoyoon, Ria, Harin, Shiho and Ahyoon. The group officially disbanded on August 25, 2022, without two years of activity.

History

2020-2022: Bullying controversy, Debut with Flamingo and disbandment
Prior to debuting in Botopass, Cui Xiang, Seoyoon and Jiwon were members of WKS ENE's previous girl group ILuv. The group was originally scheduled to debut in early August, however it was postponed due to a former ILuv and K-pop idol Minah, accusing fellow ILuv members of bullying her. As a result of this, people began to demand that the three ILuv members be removed from the line-up. The group debuted on August 26, with the single album, Flamingo, and the full original line-up.

In September 2021, Mihee was confirmed to be a participant in the MBC survival show My Teenage Girl and temporarily went on hiatus from the group. 

On August 25, 2022, The group officially disbanded, 2 years after their official debut.

Members
Mihee (미희)
Jiwon (지원)
Cui Xiang (최상)
Seoyoon (서윤)
Ria (리아)
Harin (하린)
Shiho (시호)
Ahyoon (아윤)

Discography

Single albums

References

K-pop music groups
South Korean girl groups
South Korean dance music groups
Musical groups from Seoul
Musical groups established in 2020
2020 establishments in South Korea
South Korean pop music groups
2022 disestablishments in South Korea